This article is a list of historic places in Westmorland County, New Brunswick entered on the Canadian Register of Historic Places, whether they are federal, provincial, or municipal. For listings in Moncton, see List of historic places in Moncton, New Brunswick.

List of historic places outside Moncton

See also
 List of historic places in New Brunswick
 List of National Historic Sites of Canada in New Brunswick

Westmorland County, New Brunswick